The 2014–15 European Rugby Champions Cup pool stage was the first stage of the 20th season of European club rugby union, and the first to be organised under the new European Rugby Champions Cup format, which replaced the Heineken Cup as the top European competition for clubs.

It involved 20 teams competing, across 5 pools of 4 teams, for 8 quarter-final places – which were awarded to the 5 pool winners and the 3 top-ranked pool runners-up.

The pool stage began on the weekend of 17–19 October 2014, and was completed on the weekend of 23–25 January 2015.

Seeding
The 20 teams were seeded through a new system based solely on clubs' performance in their domestic leagues for the previous season, whereas the previous tournament, the Heineken Cup, seeded teams based on performance in European competition over 4 previous seasons.

English teams were seeded by performance in the 2013–14 Aviva Premiership. Club seeding was based on regular season competition (Rounds 1 – 22) only.
French teams were seeded by performance in the 2013–14 Top 14. Clubs were seeded based on performance in the regular season and subsequent play-off phase
Irish, Italian, Scottish and Welsh teams were seeded by performance in the 2013–14 Pro12. Clubs were seeded based on performance in the regular season and subsequent play-offs.

Where teams were seeded based on play-off performance, if teams were eliminated in the same round of a knock-out tournament, their league position at the end of the regular season determined which team received a higher seed.

Teams were then placed into 4 Tiers, each containing 5 teams, based on their seeding. A draw determined which two second seeded teams completed Tier 1, and based on this, the fourth seeded teams were allocated to either Tier 2 and Tier 3.

The brackets show each team's seeding and their league (for example, 1 Top 14 indicates the team was seeded 1st from the Top 14).

Pool stage
The draw took place on 10 June 2014, at the Stade de la Maladière in Neuchâtel.	

Teams played each other twice, both at home and away, in the group stage, that began on the weekend of 17–19 October 2014, and continued through to 23–25 January 2015.

The pool stage of the competition used the same competition point system as previous European competitions, where, based on the result of the match, teams receive:
 4 points for a win,
 2 points for a draw,
 1 attacking bonus point for scoring four or more tries in a match,
 1 defensive bonus point for losing a match by seven points or less.

Based on these competition points, the five pool winners from each group progressed to the quarter-finals, along with the three best pool runners-up from the competition. If at any point in the competition there was a tie between two or more teams from the same pool, the following criteria were used as tie-breakers:
 The club with the greater number of competition points from only matches involving tied teams.
 If equal, the club that scored the most tries in those matches.
 If equal, the club with the best aggregate points difference from those matches.

If this did not separate teams, and/or the tie related to teams that did not play each other (i.e., in different pools), the following tie breakers were used:
 The club that scored the most tries in the pool stage.
 If equal, the club with the best aggregate points difference from the pool stage.
 If equal, the club with the fewest players suspended in the pool stage.
 If equal, the drawing of lots will determine a club's ranking.

Fixtures were announced on Thursday 14 August 2014. Alongside the exact dates and kick-off times for rounds 1 and 2. Exact times for Rounds 3 and 4 were announced 10 October 2014, and for Rounds 5 and 6 were announced 19 December 2014.

Pool 1

Note: Original referee Poite, was injured during the 73rd minute, and Berdos replaced him for remainder of the match.

Pool 2

Note:
 This was Wasps' last match played at Adams Park, their home ground since 2002, before moving to Ricoh Arena.

Pool 3

Pool 4

Pool 5

See also
2014–15 European Rugby Champions Cup

References

2014–15 European Rugby Champions Cup
2014–15